The National Treasury School, or École nationale du Trésor public, is the French government's school for training civil servants, and future civil servants, for competitive entry to finance posts in the French civil service.

The school has three bases, as follows:-

 Noisiel (Seine-et-Marne), headquarters and training of future inspectors (Category A) ;
 Lyon (Rhône), training of financial controllers (Category B) ;
 Noisy-le-Grand (Seine-Saint-Denis), for administrative staff (Category C).

Training organizations